The Kickback is an American indie rock band currently based in Chicago, Illinois. The quartet consists of lead Billy Yost, guitarist Jonny Ifergan, and bassist Daniel Leu. They released their debut LP, Sorry All Over the Place, on September 18, 2015 via Jullian Records. The album was recorded by Jim Eno (the drummer for Spoon) at his studio Public Hi-Fi in Austin, Texas. Rolling Stone says The Kickback "conjures the very best parts of The Veils and The Walkmen and The Killers, writing lean, nervy songs that snarl and snap." Their sophomore album Weddings & Funerals was released on July 14, 2017. They have also released a clutch of EPs.

History
The group was formed as singer/guitarist Billy Yost's "first attempt to get a 'college band thing' going" at the University of South Dakota in Vermillion, South Dakota. The band name was chosen after Yost's readings on the Enron scandal while attending the university.

Early years
The story begins in 2009 when Billy and Danny Yost and Zach Verdoorn decided to leave their South Dakota home and move to Chicago."I was terrified about making the move ... I loved where I grew up. I spent a lot of time there writing songs for this record, and figuring out what I had to offer.  But I needed a bigger pool of musicians who I had things in common with musically", he has stated. Upon arriving in Chicago, Yost assembled the band through Craigslist ads, weathering a series of changes until the band arrived at the current lineup. Despite Yost's status as the founding member and primary songwriter, The Kickback is a truly collaborative effort built around each member’s artistic vision.

A clutch of EPs
After releasing "Great Self Love" in 2010 and "Mea Culpa Mea Culpa" in 2011, they received attention from Rolling Stone's Hype Monitor blog as well as Chicago music critic and Sound Opinions contributor Jim DeRogatis.

After a few years of writing and recording demos, the band was ready to record their debut LP. A milestone moment came when the band, with humor and bravado, sent their demos to Jim Eno from Spoon (one of Billy’s primary modern artistic inspirations). Jim responded favorably and got in touch with the band.

Sorry All Over the Place
The Kickback's debut LP was released September 18, 2015, on Jullian Records. It was recorded and produced by Jim Eno at his studio Public Hi-Fi in Austin, Texas. Consequence of Sound announced the album and premiered the track "White Lodge" on June 15, 2015. Grantland called the track "a witty, nervy, and melodic dagger that exudes dread without completely giving up on the possibility of transcendence." The Nerdist premiered the full album and said "[The Kickback's] extremely competent, catchy debut effort Sorry All Over the Place belies how nimbly the group is able to transition from ballad to Smashing Pumpkins-esque rock outbursts, to extended instrumental jams."

Weddings & Funerals
The Kickback's sophomore album, produced by Dennis Herring, was released on July 14, 2017. It was announced by Billboard and Consequence of Sound, along with a premiere of their new single "Will T" on May 12, 2017.

Touring
The band has developed a reputation for their live performance. The Kickback have toured nationally on multiple occasions and are known for their energy and Yost's aggressive interaction with audiences. Bands they have supported previously include Bush, White Rabbits, Smith Westerns, Manic Street Preachers, Here We Go Magic, Tapes n Tapes, Telekinesis, Ringo Deathstarr, Miracle Legion, and The Districts. The band has performed at South by Southwest, North by Northeast, Canadian Music Week, 80/35, Summerfest, Mile of Music, CMJ, among other notable music festivals.

Podcast
Starting in December 2010, The Kickback began hosting their own podcast, Disas-tour,  which features discussions and segments centered around the band and its current activities. The episodes originate from on-the-road locations as well as at the band's rehearsal space in Chicago. Yost cites the podcast as an effort to convey "what it's really like to be a band that can't afford to be making music 24-hours of the day" as well as "things that sort of influence the band's direction (Michael Keaton movies, the Muppets, manic-depression, etc.). Since 2010, the group has aired over 100 episodes of the popular series.

Discography

LPs
 Sorry All Over the Place (2015, Jullian Records)
 Weddings & Funerals (2017, Jullian Records)

EPs
 Great Self Love (2011, Spat!)
 Mea Culpa Mea Culpa (2011, Self)
 Kill Fee (2012, Self)

Singles
 "Alliteration, Etc." (CD, 2009, Spat!)
 "Please Hurt" (7"/Cassette, 2013, In Store Recordings)
 "When I Die" (Digital Single, 2014, Self)

References

External links
 Official Website

Indie rock musical groups from South Dakota
People from Vermillion, South Dakota
Musical groups from Chicago